Project EnergyConnect is a new electricity transmission line under construction which will connect the South Australia and New South Wales districts of the National Electricity Market in Australia. Riverlink was a previous working title for the project, drawn from a proposal first raised in 1999. The Australian Energy Market Operator used RiverLink in its proposal for this interconnector, but the transmission companies in South Australia (ElectraNet) and New South Wales (TransGrid) now call it EnergyConnect.

South Australia and New South Wales already each have connections to Victoria, which also has a connection across Bass Strait to Tasmania, and New South Wales also has connections to Queensland. The connection between New South Wales and South Australia is intended to provide resilience and redundancy to the network. It is aimed to provide increased security of supply to South Australia and improve sharing of renewable energy with New South Wales.

Construction of the new interconnector is expected to cost . It is proposed to have a spur from Buronga to Red Cliffs in Victoria. Assessment of the Regulatory Investment Test for Transmission (RIT-T) began in June 2019.

The link endpoints are at Robertstown in South Australia where major transmission lines connect to the north and south of the state, and Wagga Wagga, the furthest west in New South Wales that the high voltage lines reach. The new high-voltage line is expected to improve the feasibility of more solar and wind farms in the areas traversed by the line.

The Australian Energy Market Commission changed its rules in April 2019 to streamline the regulatory process for several network upgrades including Project EnergyConnect. The change allows the Australian Energy Regulator to consider the proposals concurrently. ElectraNet established information hubs near the South Australian part of the route to consult the public about the detailed route. One of the concerns is that the proposed route crosses Calperum Station which is home to a critically endangered species, the black-eared miner. New South Wales put the project on a fast-track development process by assigning it "critical infrastructure" status. The Clean Energy Finance Corporation issued a $295 million debt instrument for the project in May 2021.

The connection between those will operate at South Australia's transmission voltage of 275kV. The interconnector main line east from Bundey will operate at New South Wales voltage of 330kV. Substation construction contracts to build the new Bundey substation and expand Robertstown and Tungkillo substations were awarded to Consolidated Power Projects. The contract for the transmission lines to the South Australian border was let to Downer Utilities Australia. Construction began with the first towers out from Robertstown on 15 February 2022. The connection to Buronga is expected to be completed late in 2023, and the full link to Wagga Wagga by early 2025.

References

Electric power transmission systems in Australia
Energy in South Australia
Energy in New South Wales